A by-election for the Australian House of Representatives seat of North Sydney was held on 5 December 2015 from 8 am to 6 pm AEDT.

The trigger for the by-election was the 23 October parliamentary resignation of Joe Hockey, the backbench Liberal Member for North Sydney and former Abbott Coalition Government Treasurer.

House of Representatives Speaker Tony Smith issued the writ for the by-election on 26 October. The electoral roll containing 104,352 electors closed on 2 November. Candidate nominations closed on 12 November, and the draw of the ballot paper order occurred on 13 November.

The by-election was won by Liberal candidate Trent Zimmerman, a former Hockey staffer, whose pre-selection had been controversial. Zimmerman won with 48.2 percent of the primary vote after a larger-than-predicted 12.8 percent swing against the Turnbull Coalition Government. This was only the second time in North Sydney's history that the successful Liberal candidate did not obtain a majority of the primary vote and had to rely on preferences. Zimmerman faced a double-digit primary vote swing − more than triple that of the 2015 Canning by-election − despite the absence of a Labor candidate. Labor have never been successful in the safe Liberal seat. 

The Liberal two-candidate vote of 60.2 percent against independent Stephen Ruff compares to the previous election vote of 65.9 percent against Labor. The reduction of 5.7 percent cannot be considered a "two-party/candidate preferred swing" − when a major party is absent, preference flows to both major parties does not take place, resulting in asymmetric preference flows.

Ian Macfarlane attempted to defect from the Liberal party room to the National party room with accompanying demands for additional Nationals cabinet representation, and the Mal Brough / James Ashby diary controversy deepened in the last week of the campaign. Along with the unexpected by-election swing and Turnbull's significantly lessened personal ratings in the concurrent December Newspoll, some News Corp journalists opined Malcolm Turnbull's honeymoon to be over.

Zimmerman became the first openly-LGBTI member of the House of Representatives.

Candidates

Labor declined to field a candidate in the safe Liberal seat.

By-election events
The campaign began amid claims of "widespread discontent for the Liberal pre-selection factional fix of Trent Zimmerman" and in the absence of a Labor candidate. Hockey's predecessor, former independent North Sydney MP Ted Mack, announced he would steer the campaign of independent candidate Stephen Ruff, who had the support of some disgruntled Liberal supporters. Ruff was a late entrant into the 2015 New South Wales state election. Despite having no financial or campaign support and facing veteran Liberal incumbent Jillian Skinner and a Labor candidate in the overlapping state seat of North Shore, Ruff won more than 10 percent of the vote.

Regarding the North Sydney by-election, Mack stated "I've never seen an election where a Liberal candidate is so disliked by such a lot of Liberal members and Liberal voters". Leaked emails show potential voters were sent registration forms at 7:30 pm on a Thursday and asked to signal their availability, with the cut-off for replying by noon the next day. Advance notice of the e-mail and cut-off was provided to Zimmerman's backers. It was claimed up to 550 Liberal branch members were unable to vote after the Liberal state executive pushed through a shortened pre-selection process to select Zimmerman. Zimmerman is head of the body that sets the rules for Liberal pre-selections, which has been claimed as a "complete conflict of interest". Former North Sydney Liberal party member John Ruddick, described by journalist Peter Hartcher as a "prominent party reform activist", advocated that voters disenfranchised by the pre-selection process to preference Zimmerman last. 

Mack also claimed that much of the electorate was angered that Hockey, who had written the "age of entitlement" speech, had forced a $1-million by-election within a year of the 2016 federal election, with the expectation of becoming the next Ambassador of Australia to the United States. The expectation was confirmed a few days after the by-election on 8 December. 

The Liberal party room suffered from the attempted defection of Ian Macfarlane from the Liberal party room to the National party room with accompanying demands for additional Nationals cabinet representation, and the Mal Brough / James Ashby diary controversy deepened in the last week of the campaign.

How-to-vote cards
Candidate volunteers distribute how-to-vote cards to voters at polling booths which show the candidate's suggested preference allocation. Candidates and parties which suggested preferences are shown in each column of the table below. Several candidates ran open tickets at this by-election.

Polling
Two days out, a ReachTEL automated phone poll of 678 respondents, commissioned by the Save Our Councils Coalition, showed the Liberals with a 54.7 percent primary vote  after exclusion of the 15.3 percent undecided. Accurately interpreted, this amounted to a 6.4 percent drop from the 2013 Liberal vote, rather than the 14.7 percent in the report, which ignored the undecided component. The poll result had the Greens on 22.8 percent, the Christian Democratic Party on 4.1 percent, and everyone else on 18.3 percent.

Results

Results were final as of 22 December.

Liberal candidate Trent Zimmerman won with 48.2 percent of the primary vote after a larger-than-predicted 12.8 percent swing against the Turnbull Coalition Government. This was only the second time in North Sydney's history that the successful Liberal candidate did not obtain a majority of the primary vote and had to rely on preferences. Zimmerman faced a double-digit primary vote swing − more than triple that of the 2015 Canning by-election − despite the absence of a Labor candidate. Labor have never been successful in the safe Liberal seat. 

The Liberal two-candidate vote of 60.2 percent against independent Stephen Ruff compares to the previous election vote of 65.9 percent against Labor. The reduction of 5.7 percent cannot be considered a "two-party/candidate preferred swing"—when a major party is absent, preference flows to both major parties does not take place, resulting in asymmetric preference flows.

See also
Electoral results for the Division of North Sydney
List of Australian federal by-elections

References

External links

New South Wales federal by-elections
2015 elections in Australia